Sabbarin was a Palestinian Arab village located 28 kilometers south of Haifa. It was depopulated during the 1947–1948 civil war in Mandatory Palestine.

History

Late Ottoman period
In 1859 Sabbarin had about 600 inhabitants, who cultivated 55 faddans (1 faddan =100-250 dunums) of land.

The French explorer Victor Guérin visited the village in 1870, and noted that the villagers cultivated sesame. A well, called Bir Sabbarin, appeared well built. The village had an estimated 1000 inhabitants, with homes constructed of stones or adobe.

In the 1882, the PEF's Survey of Western Palestine described Sabbarin as a "large" village, situated on a slope. The well was said to be the head of the Caesarea aqueduct. The oval well was 15 feet diameter and 15 feet deep.

A population list from about 1887 showed that Subbarin had about 1,160 inhabitants; all Muslims.

British Mandate period
In the 1922 census of Palestine, conducted by the British Mandate authorities, Sabbarin had a population of 845; 833 Muslims and 12 Christian, where the Christians were all Roman Catholics. The population had increased in the 1931 census to 1,108; 18 Christians and the rest Muslim, in a total of 256 houses.

In the 1945 statistics, the village had a population of 1,700; 1,670 Muslims and 30 Christians and the village's lands spanned 25,307 dunams. 12,773 dunums of land used for cereals; 45 dunums were irrigated or used for orchards, while 179 dunams were built-up (urban) land.

1948 and aftermath
Sabbarin was captured by Israeli forces on May 12, 1948 during the 1947–1948 civil war in Mandatory Palestine in Operation Coastal Clearing. It was defended by a local militia and possibly the Arab Liberation Army. According to Benny Morris, the Irgun (IZL) encountered resistance there and the majority of the villagers fled after 20 of them were killed in a firefight, with an IZL armoured car firing on the villagers as they fled. More than one hundred people who had not fled, including the elderly, women, and children, were held behind barbed wire for a few days before being expelled to nearby Umm al-Fahm. Others who had fled earlier ended up in refugee camps in the Jenin area.

An IZL officer recounted how during a search of the column of refugees, a pistol and a rifle were found. Seven men were detained and were asked who the weapons belonged to. After they refused to answer, the IZL men threatened them with death. After still refusing to answer, the IZL men carried out a "field court martial," sentenced the seven to death, and thereafter executed them on the spot.

Following the war the area was incorporated into the State of Israel. Kibbutz Ramot Menashe was established northeast of the site in 1948, and Moshav Amikam was founded in 1950, 1 km south of the village site.

Khalidi described the place in 1992: The large site, strewn with the stone debris of houses, is overgrown with wild thorns. The thorns are interspersed with cactuses and pine, fig, olive and mulberry trees. Some of the surrounding lands are used by Israelis as pasture and growing fruit trees.

Families from Sabbarin
From Palestineremembered.com.
 Al-Abhari (Arabic: العبهري  )
 Al-Abdallah (Arabic: ال عبدالله )
 Al-Hajj Mahmud (Arabic: الحج محمود )
 Al-De'emeh (Arabic: الدعمة )
 Abu Libdi (Arabic: ابو لبده )
 Ghnima (Arabic: غنيمه )
 Hatab (Arabic: حطاب )
 Abu Diab (Arabic: ابو ذياب)
 Al Mallah (Arabic: الملاح)
 Al-Hmedih
 Al-Masri (Arabic: المصري)
 Abu Kabir
 Abu Sammen (Arabic: أبو سمن )
 Faraj (Arabic: فرج )

References

Bibliography

External links
Welcome To Sabbarin
 Sabbarin,  Zochrot
Survey of Western Palestine, Map 8: IAA,  Wikimedia commons
Sabbarin,  at Khalil Sakakini Cultural Center
Mey Kedem, archaeological site in Moshav Amikam centered on a Roman water tunnel starting at Ein Tzabarin Springs

District of Haifa
Arab villages depopulated prior to the 1948 Arab–Israeli War